Emerick is an unincorporated community in Madison County, Nebraska, United States.

History
A post office was established at Emerick in 1873, and remained in operation until it was discontinued in 1920. The community was named for John Emerick, a pioneer settler.

References

Unincorporated communities in Madison County, Nebraska
Unincorporated communities in Nebraska